Kendra Jade (born April 19, 1977) is an American model, actress, and former adult film star.  Jade appeared on the VH1 reality television series Sex Rehab with Dr. Drew and Sober House.  During these shows, Jade was treated for sex addiction and alcoholism by Dr. Drew Pinsky.

Career
Jade is credited with 45 porn films, and appeared on the Howard Stern Radio Show. She was the featured star of the final issue of the Carnal Comics "True Stories of Adult Film Stars" line.  Dropping out of the adult entertainment industry in 2001, Jade began touring throughout the country as the featured burlesque performer in gentlemen's clubs. She has appeared in music videos, feature films, magazines, radio, print, and television.

She is an activist in animal rights issues and operates her own animal rescue.

Personal life
Jade moved to Southern California in her early twenties and quickly became a star in adult films.  She fell into the Hollywood party scene and was once linked to a sex tape scandal involving Jerry Springer.

Jade met Canadian singer-songwriter Lukas Rossi soon after he landed the lead singer position with Rock Star Supernova, the reality television-formed supergroup featuring Tommy Lee, Gilby Clarke, and Jason Newsted.  The two were introduced by mutual friends Tommy Lee and Dave Navarro in 2006 and were married in May 2007.

In a 2015 interview with ET Canada Jade's husband Lukas announced the couple had adopted a son named Bryden.

In 2021 Kendra and husband Lukas divorced.

Film
Wind Song (1998)
Beach Bunnies with Big Brown Eyes (1999)
Royal Rumble (1999)
WWF Royal Rumble: No Chance In Hell (1999)
Tricked by an Angel (2001)
Being Ron Jeremy (2003)

TV
Judge Joe Brown - Sued for taking money from a dupe (1997)
Howard Stern (13 episodes 1997-2002)
Howard Stern on Demand (2006)
Sex Rehab with Dr. Drew (2009)
Celebrity Rehab Presents Sober House (2010)

References

External links

 
 
 
 

1977 births
American pornographic film actresses
Living people
People from Northampton, Massachusetts
Pornographic film actors from Massachusetts
21st-century American women